The 1915 VMI Keydets football team represented the Virginia Military Institute (VMI) in their 25th season of organized football. Frank Gorton lead the Keydets to another successful year with a 6–2–1 record.

Schedule

References

VMI
VMI Keydets football seasons
VMI Keydets football